Conway School District can refer to:
 Conway School District (Arkansas) - Conway, Arkansas
 Conway School District (New Hampshire) in New Hampshire
 Conway Consolidated School District in Washington state